James Patterson Sterrett (November 7, 1822 – January 22, 1901) was a Pennsylvania jurist.

He graduated from Jefferson College (now Washington & Jefferson College) in 1845.

He was a trustee of Jefferson College from 1855 until its union with Washington College in 1865; he was a trustee of the unified board until 1885.

He joined the Pennsylvania Supreme Court on February 26, 1877.
He became chief justice in 1893, and remained on the bench until 1900.

References

Pennsylvania lawyers
Justices of the Supreme Court of Pennsylvania
Washington & Jefferson College trustees
Washington & Jefferson College alumni
Burials at Allegheny Cemetery